"Girls on Film" is the third single by English new wave band Duran Duran, released on 13 July 1981.

The single became Duran Duran's Top 10 breakthrough in the UK Singles Chart, peaking at Number 5 in July 1981. The band personally selected the song for release following the failure of its predecessor, "Careless Memories", which had been chosen by their record company, EMI. Its popularity provided a major boost to sales of the band's eponymous debut studio album, Duran Duran, which had been released a month earlier.

The song did not chart in the United States on its initial release, but it became popular and widely known after receiving heavy airplay on MTV when the Duran Duran album was re-issued in 1983.

Background
Originally written and demoed in 1979 by an early line-up of the band featuring lead vocalist Andy Wickett, Duran Duran re-wrote and re-recorded the song in 1981. The different original version, which co-writer Wickett said "was inspired by the dark side of the glitz and glamour", was released as part of an EP in 2018.

Music video
The song fared well on the radio and the charts before the music video was filmed, but the controversy that ensued helped to keep the band in the public eye and the song on the charts for many weeks.

The video was made with directing duo Godley & Creme (of 10cc fame) and director of photography Steven Bernstein at Shepperton Studios in July 1981. It was filmed just weeks before MTV was launched in the United States and before anyone knew what an impact the music channel would have on the industry. The band expected the "Girls on Film" video to be played exclusively at nightclubs that had video screens. The raunchy video created an uproar, and it was consequently banned by the BBC and heavily edited for its original run on MTV; the band unabashedly enjoyed and capitalised on the controversy.

A Video 45 for "Girls on Film" and "Hungry Like the Wolf" was released in the United States in March 1983. The VHS-format tape contains the MTV-friendly edited "day version" of "Girls on Film", while the Betamax and CED Videodisc format contained the original uncensored "night version". The Video 45 won the Grammy Award for Best Short Form Music Video in 1984, the first year the Academy gave that award. The uncensored video was also included in the Duran Duran video album (1983) and the Greatest video collection (released on VHS in 1999, and on DVD in 2004, which was given a restrictive 18 rating in the United Kingdom and Ireland) and was given the R13 rating in New Zealand. The edited version would later be used in the 2008 karaoke video game SingStar Pop Vol. 2.

Simon Le Bon commented in the audio interview on the Greatest DVD collection that the scandal of the music video overshadowed the song's message of fashion model exploitation.

B-sides, bonus tracks and remixes
The B-side of the single was another song initially unavailable anywhere else, a synthesiser-heavy dance track called "Faster Than Light".

The extended night version of "Girls on Film", similar to "Planet Earth" wasn't a remix, but a completely new arrangement of the song.

There are two slightly different mixes of the Night Version, one clocking in at 5:45, the other at 5:27. The video version clocks in at 6:19.

In 1998, EMI released Girls on Film – The Remixes, featuring a swathe of newly commissioned re-constructions of the song by Tall Paul and Tin Tin Out. A couple of these mixes were included on the 1998 UK release of the single "Electric Barbarella".

Covers, samples, and media references
Cover versions of "Girls on Film" have been recorded by Björn Again, Wesley Willis Fiasco, the Living End, Girls Aloud, Jive Bunny and the Mastermixers, Billy Preston, Kevin Max, La Ley, Midnight Oil, Mindless Self Indulgence and Chord Overstreet.

Formats and track listing

7": EMI. / EMI 5206 United Kingdom
 "Girls on Film" – 3:29
 "Faster than Light" – 4:26

12": EMI. / 12 EMI 5206 United Kingdom
 "Girls on Film (Night Version)" – 5:31
 "Girls on Film" – 3:29
 "Faster than Light" – 4:26

12": EMI. / 062-20 07176 Greece 
 "Girls on Film (Night Version)" – 5:45
 "Girls on Film (Instrumental)" – 5:41
 "Faster than Light" – 4:26
 The Greek 12" release of "Girls on Film" contains a version with a longer camera intro not found on the other 12 inches. It was also released on some versions of the 1982 Carnaval EP. It appeared for the first time on CD on the 2010 remaster of Duran Duran as the "Extended Night Version".
 The "Instrumental" was not released on other vinyl releases and remains unreleased on CD.

CD: Part of "Singles Box Set 1981–1985" boxset
 "Girls on Film" – 3:27
 "Faster than Light" – 4:26
 "Girls on Film (Night Version)" – 5:31

CD: Part of Duran Duran 2010 Special Edition (CD2) 
 "Girls on Film" (Extended Night Version) – 5:45
 "Girls on Film" (Night Mix) – 5:42
 Track 1 is the same version as the Greek 12" release (EMI / 062-20 0717 6).
 Released in 2010.

CD: The Remixes United States
 "Girls on Film" (Tin Tin Out Mix) – 6:55
 "Girls on Film" (Salt Tank Mix) – 6:29
 "Girls on Film" (16 Millimetre Mix) – 7:28
 "Girls on Film" (Tall Paul Mix 1) – 8:28
 "Girls on Film" (Night Version) – 5:31
 "Girls on Film" (8 Millimetre Mix) – 5:47

 Released in 1999

12": The Remixes United States
 "Girls on Film" (Tin Tin Out Mix) – 6:55
 "Girls on Film" (Salt Tank Mix) – 6:29
 "Girls on Film" (Tall Paul Mix 1) – 8:28
 "Girls on Film" (8 Millimetre Mix) – 5:47

 Released in 1999

Charts

Weekly charts

Year-end charts

As of October 2021 "Girls on Film" is the fifth most streamed Duran Duran song in the UK.

Certifications

Other appearances
Apart from the single, "Girls on Film" has also appeared on:

EP's
 Nite Romantics (1981, Japan)
 Night Versions  (1982, Australia) (1984, New Zealand)
 Carnival (1982, The Netherlands, Spain, Canada, United States, except from the Japanese release)
Mini-LP:
 DMM Mega Mixes (1983, Germany)
Albums:
 Duran Duran (1981)
 Decade (1989)
 Night Versions: The Essential Duran Duran (1998)
 Greatest (1998)
 Strange Behaviour (1999)
 Arena (2004 reissue)
 Singles Box Set 1981-1985 (2005)
 Live from London (Bonus CD with Deluxe Edition) (2005)

Singles:
 "Ordinary World" (1993)
 "Electric Barbarella" (1998)

Personnel
Duran Duran are:
Simon Le Bon – vocals
Nick Rhodes – keyboards
John Taylor – bass guitar
Roger Taylor – drums
Andy Taylor – guitar

Also credited:
Colin Thurston – producer and engineer

See also
Nudity in music videos
Sexuality in music videos

References

External links
 Official site
  , page 6

1981 singles
Duran Duran songs
Girls Aloud songs
Song recordings produced by Xenomania
Music videos directed by Godley and Creme
Grammy Award for Best Short Form Music Video
Song recordings produced by Colin Thurston
Anime songs
1980 songs
Songs written by Simon Le Bon
Songs written by John Taylor (bass guitarist)
Songs written by Roger Taylor (Duran Duran drummer)
Songs written by Andy Taylor (guitarist)
Songs written by Nick Rhodes